The rainbow goodeid (Characodon lateralis) is a species of fish in the family Goodeidae endemic to Mexico.

References

Characodon
Freshwater fish of Mexico
Fish described in 1866
Taxa named by Albert Günther
Taxonomy articles created by Polbot